Bojay Bruce Feleunga Filimoeatu (born December 6, 1989) is an American football coach and former linebacker who is currently the defensive line coach at UNLV. He played college football at Utah State and played in the NFL briefly for the Oakland Raiders before becoming a college football coach.

Early life and high school career
Born in Fontana, California and raised in West Valley City, Utah, Filimoeatu graduated from Granger High School in West Valley City in 2008. He played at linebacker and fullback at Granger.

College career
Returning to his native California, Filimoeatu began his college football career on the junior college level at Mt. San Antonio College (Mt. SAC) in Walnut near Los Angeles. Helping Mt. SAC win its second straight state title, Filimoeatu was the 2010 CCCAA Defensive MVP. On January 30, 2011, Filimoeatu signed his letter of intent with Utah State, one of four Division I FBS schools to offer him scholarships.

He started all 26 games in the 2011 and 2012 seasons at Utah State and registered 112 tackles (48 solo), eight sacks, one interception, two passes defensed, two forced fumbles and one fumble recovery. During his senior season, he posted 71 tackles and five sacks.

Professional career
Due to a knee injury during the Casino Del Sol College All Star Game in January 2013, Filimoeatu put his football career on hold and only tried out before NFL scouts at Utah State pro day prior to the 2014 NFL draft. Filimoeatu originally signed with the Oakland Raiders as an undrafted free agent on May 19, 2014 and was waived by the team at the end of training camp before signing to the practice squad two days later. On September 13, 2014, Filimoeatu was promoted to the active roster after a season-ending injury to Taiwan Jones. Filimoeatu made his NFL debut on September 14 against the Houston Texans. For the 2014 season, Filimoeatu played in eight games and made six tackles. Filimoeatu did not see any game action in 2015.

Coaching career
Filimoeatu began his coaching career in 2016 at Oregon State as inside linebackers and defensive quality control coach under Brent Brennan. When Brennan became head coach at  San Jose State, Filimoeatu followed him there in 2017 as linebackers coach. On December 19, 2018, returning head coach Gary Andersen hired him to be the defensive ends coach on his new staff.

References

External links
 
 NFL.com profile

Living people
1989 births
American football linebackers
Utah State Aggies football players
Oakland Raiders players
Sportspeople from San Bernardino County, California
People from Fontana, California
People from West Valley City, Utah
Players of American football from California
Players of American football from Utah
Mt. SAC Mounties football players
Oregon State Beavers football coaches
San Jose State Spartans football coaches
American people of Tongan descent
People from Montclair, California
Utah State Aggies football coaches